Chiusa or Klausen is a municipality in South Tyrol, Italy.

Chiusa (Italian, 'closed' or 'lock') may also refer to several other municipalities in Italy:

Chiusa di Pesio, in the Province of Cuneo, Piedmont 
Chiusa di San Michele, in the Province of Turin, Piedmont
Chiusa Sclafani, in the Province of Palermo, Sicily 
Chiusaforte, in the Province of Udine, Friuli-Venezia Giulia
Chiusavecchia, in der Province of Imperia, Liguria

See also
Chiusi, a municipality in the Province of Siena, Tuscany
Chiusi della Verna, a municipality in the Province of Arezzo, Tuscany